Kaif-e-Baharan is a 2018 Pakistani television serial premiered on Geo Entertainment on 25 February 2018. It is produced by Babar Javed under A&B Entertainment. It stars Aiman Khan, Marina Khan and Huma Nawab, the latter two starred together in a series since Nijaat (1993) and Farar (1996).

Plot
The drama revolves around a girl named Seerat Fatima who is left by her mother at the age of three and she is brought up by an addict father. Twenty three year old Fatima is now a school teacher with an ill father. Kamran is the son of Shaista who is a heart patient and single parent. She wishes to marry off her son to her niece Farwa despite Kamran's lack of interest in her. Kamran is attacked by a gangster mob and Fatima saves him by sending him to the hospital. Kamran looks for his saviour and finds Fatima. Shahnawaz is the gangster who attacked Kamran and is interested in marrying Fatima. Kamran falls in love with Fatima and marries her to protect her from Shahnawaz's clutches. Due to his mother's health condition he keeps his marriage and Fatima's pregnancy a secret from his family. Shahnawaz comes back with a vengeance and shoots Kamran. He forces Fatima to marry him by threatening her with the life of her newborn son and telling her that Kamran is dead. Kamran survives but Fatima is unaware. She runs away with her son. Shahnawaz kills her father and aunt in a fire and goes to jail. Kamran assumes Fatima is dead in the fire with her father. Kamran leaves his mother's home after learning that Shaista ruthlessly rejected Fatima's plea for help. Fatima, homeless and helpless, on the run faces a lot of troubles and attempts on her honour but with a twist of fate lands  in the house of Kamran's mother. What will happen to Fatima and Kamran? Will they be able to find each other again? Who is Fatima's mother and will Fatima finally meet her mother or not?

Cast
Aiman Khan as Seerat Fatima
Marina Khan as Shaista Fatima
Muhammad Ali as Kamran
Huma Nawab as Farah
Mohsin Gilani as Azhar
Jahanzeb Khan as Ahmer
Asad Mehmood
Malik Raza as Aleem Shahnawaz
Dr.Ayesha Gul as Asma
Faiza Ali as Farwa
Talat Iqbal as Zubair
Sana Humayun as Anila

References

Pakistani drama television series
Pakistan Television Corporation original programming
Urdu-language television shows
2018 Pakistani television series debuts
Geo TV original programming